OPA! is a Malmö-based Swedish 6-member musical band with Swedish and folk / pop / ethnic influences featuring Greek-Swedish singer Michael Sideridis (lead vocals). Other members are Thor Ahlgren, Martin Eriksson, Johan Ohlsson, Andreas Rudenå and Emil Sjunnesson.

The band took part in Sweden's Melodifestivalen 2012 in day 4 of semi-finals held at Malmö Arena on 25 February 2012 with the song "Allting blir bra igen" (meaning Everything will be fine again) with music and lyrics by Michael Sideridis. They are signed with Roasting House label and distribution by Universal Music.

Following Melodifestivalen, the band released their debut album Tills du kan sjunga med that entered the Swedish Albums Chart at #26 in May 2012.

Members
Michael Sideridis - lead vocals
Thor Ahlgren - bouzouki
Martin Eriksson - double bass
Johan Ohlsson - accordion
Andreas Rudenå - guitar
Emil Sjunnesson - percussions

Discography

Albums

Singles
2012: "Allting blir bra igen" (in Melodifestivalen 2012)
2012: "Himmelskt"

References

External links
Official website 
Facebook
Twitter
Roasting House website

Swedish musical groups